Karim Alami and Julián Alonso were the defending champions, but did not participate together this year.  Alami did not participate this year.  Alonso partnered Carlos Moyá, losing in the first round.

Pablo Albano and Daniel Orsanic won in the final 7–6, 6–3, against Jiří Novák and David Rikl.

Seeds

  Luis Lobo /  Javier Sánchez (first round)
  Jiří Novák /  David Rikl (final)
  Tomás Carbonell /  Francisco Roig (quarterfinals)
  Pablo Albano /  Daniel Orsanic (champions)

Draw

Draw

External links
 Draw

Doubles